The Tour of Life (originally known as the "Lionheart Tour", and also officially referred to as the Kate Bush Tour and by outside sources as the "Kate Bush Show" and "Kate Bush: On Tour") was the first and only concert tour by English singer-songwriter and musician Kate Bush. Starting in April 1979, the tour lasted just over one month. Consisting of 24 performances from Bush's first two studio albums The Kick Inside and Lionheart (both 1978), it was acclaimed for its incorporation of mime, magic, and readings during costume changes. Bush also performed two new songs Violin and Egypt from her next album Never For Ever, released in 1980.   The tour is also renowned for its use of new technology; because of Bush's determination to dance as she sang, her stage sound engineer Gordon ‘Gungi’ Paterson developed the wireless headset microphone using a wire clothes hanger, making her the first singer to use such a device on stage. The simple staging also involved rear-screen projection and the accompaniment of two male dancers. The tour was notable for the death of Bush's lighting engineer, Bill Duffield, to whom one of the London shows was dedicated.

The tour was a critical and commercial success, with most dates selling out and additional shows being added due to high demand. Members of the Kate Bush Club were provided with a guaranteed ticket. The BBC filmed a special of the Kate Bush Show entitled Kate Bush: On Tour. The documentary featured the production and staging of the set, and revealed the extent to which Bush was involved. Broadcast in 1979, it did not show any of the full performances. The concert also spawned two physical releases, the EP On Stage (1979) as well as the home video Live at Hammersmith Odeon (1981). Live at the Hammersmith Odeon was later re-issued in 1994 as a boxed set including an audio CD of the broadcast as well as the video. The name, "Tour of Life", was not coined until after its completion, with all promotional material referring to it simply as the Kate Bush Tour. Neither the EP nor the home video makes any reference to the name.

Background and production 
After Bush turned down an opportunity to perform as a supporting act for Fleetwood Mac, production for the tour began in December 1978. Bush was said to be involved in almost every aspect of the show's design, rehearsals, and performances. The show was choreographed by Bush and Anthony Van Laast, in collaboration with dancers Stewart Avon Arnold and Gary Hurst. Dance rehearsals took place at The Place during mornings leading up to the tour, before afternoon vocal and band rehearsals in Greenwich. Production rehearsals featuring all personnel and audiovisual technology took place at Rainbow Theatre in London. Beginning on 26 March and finishing on 29 March 1978.

The tour was known for its innovative use of visual projections, audio and microphone technology, and narrative storyline. Bush aimed for the tour to offer a theatrical experience to contrast the performances of other contemporary rock musicians, and sought to combine "music, dance, poetry, mime, burlesque, magic and theatre." The performance was divided into four sections, concluding with two encores, and incorporated seventeen costume changes and involved thirteen on-stage personnel. Magician Simon Drake performed throughout the show. The stage itself was constructed with a retractable ramp at its centre, with a "large ribbed screen – intended to represent an egg – on to which slides and film footage could be projected". Eight "follow spot" moving lights tracked the musicians and performers on stage. Since the tour, Bush has become known as the first artist to use a cordless microphone headset, which allowed her to move and dance freely while singing live. The headset prototype was constructed using a coathanger and radio microphone. Ultimately, each night of the tour sold out.

The tour opened on 3 April 1979 in Liverpool at the Liverpool Empire, following a warm-up gig in Poole on 2 April 1979. Following the Poole show, the tour's lighting engineer Bill Duffield was killed after falling from a stage and seating structure at the concert venue. The first of the final three London dates on 12 May 1979 was performed as a benefit concert for the family of Duffield, and featured an altered setlist and performances by Peter Gabriel and Steve Harley. Bush released the song "Blow Away (For Bill)", dedicated to Duffield, on her third studio album Never for Ever (1980). In 1994, Bush described the physical exhaustion she experienced as a result of touring, a comment which she echoed in 2011. Bush did not tour again until 2014's Before the Dawn, a concert residency at London's Hammersmith Apollo.

Concert synopsis
The show opened with playback of whale song, with Bush's shadow projected as she began to dance while the curtain parted to reveal the stage. Bush, wearing a blue leotard, sang the first song "Moving." A shadow projection of the band's saxophone player was used next, during "The Saxophone Song". The theatre was then filled with the sound of a heartbeat as red lights flickered while the onstage piano was removed. A large oval upholstered with red satin, designed to look like an egg or womb, was rolled onto the stage, from within which Bush sang "Room for the Life" as it was rolled around the stage. Dressed in a long coat and trilby hat, Bush was joined by two male dancers to perform "Them Heavy People". She then moved to the piano to play "The Man with the Child in His Eyes". The band then played the as yet unreleased "Egypt", while Bush emerged from the back of the stage wearing an Egyptian costume. An extended introduction to "L'Amour Looks Something Like You" was then played in darkness, while Bush changed into a black leotard and red skirt. While at centre-stage by a tall mirror, a magician emerged to perform with a flying cane. Bush performed "Violin", wearing bat wings and taunted by her two dancers dressed as giant violins. As the stage darkened, Bush's brother, John Carder Bush, recited a poem, which culminated in a spoken duet with Bush herself. She was then illuminated by a spotlight for the performance "The Kick Inside" at the piano. A black veil was placed over her and the curtains closed.

The second section began with the curtains parting to reveal Bush wearing a long black dress, sitting on top of a piano to perform "In the Warm Room". She then played the piano while singing "Fullhouse", after which the band played an extended introduction to "Strange Phenomena" as Bush changed into a magician's top hat and tails, while her dancers, now dressed as space men, performed with her. The magician then reappeared with his cane; he walked to the back of the stage holding a black cloth, which then dropped to reveal Bush, now wearing a veil, behind it. She danced with a male dancer to a live rehearsal playback recording of "Hammer Horror", recreating the routine from its music video, after which a chant commenced, leading into "Kashka from Baghdad", performed at the piano. Traffic noise was played to the audience while the stage was fitted with a street theme, including fences which the dancers illuminated with torches. A spotlight was switched on and Bush sang and danced to "Don't Push Your Foot on the Heartbrake", bringing the second section to a close.

The third section began with the curtain opening on Bush, now wearing a purple dress, at the edge of the ramp which had been lifted to replicate a pier, to perform "Wow." "Coffee Homeground" began as a prisoner cell set was assembled; Bush sang on a centre-stage chair, as corpse props fell out of the walls. Another spoken word poem was recited by Bush's brother as "Symphony in Blue" (incorporating elements of "Gymnopédie 1" by Erik Satie) began to be played. Bush, now dressed in a blue leotard covered by a leather jacket, performed while waving to the audience as images of a cloudy sky were projected. Bush, now covered in party streamers refused a floating glass of champagne from the magician and performed "Feel It" at the piano. As the song came to an end, thunder was heard while Bush changed; she emerged with her leotard now fitted with wings, to perform "Kite", being lifted off the stage at the end of the song. Bush then appeared in Wild West attire whilst brandishing a shotgun, dancing and singing to "James and the Cold Gun". Her dancers, emerging from the wings, were shot by Bush using red ribbons acting as gunfire as the song ended and the curtain closed.

For the show's first encore, Bush and her dancers emerged wearing World War II bomber attire as a parachute was spread across the stage. She sat to sing "Oh England My Lionheart", and the curtain closed again. There was a short interval before the curtains re-opened upon the stage covered in dry ice fog and illuminated in red with a forest backdrop. As the music to "Wuthering Heights" began, Bush sprang up through the fog, costumed as the ghost of Catherine Earnshaw from Emily Brontë's novel of the same name. She performed the dance routine from the song's music video, before retreating to the top of the ramp, waving to the audience, and exiting the stage as the curtain closed.

Critical reception
Reaction to the tour performances was overwhelmingly positive. In 2010, The Guardian noted that British reviews of the tour were almost universally "euphoric".

Describing the show as "exceptional", Robin Denselow of The Guardian praised the show's "innovation in rock choreography and microphone design". However, Denselow was critical of Bush's vocals, describing Bush as possessing a "shrill acrobatic voice". A review in Melody Maker disagreed, praising both Bush's lower and higher-pitched vocal registers, whilst noting that Bush had created "a series of tableaux vivants of peerless visual and aural dazzle that added immeasurably to the complexity and variable excellence of her songs." Another reviewer for Melody Maker described the tour's performance in Birmingham as "the most magnificent spectacle ever encountered in the world of rock". The Telegraph described Bush as a "stunningly original stage performer", praising the setlist of the show as "dazzling testimony to a remarkable talent, evidently intense rehearsal and technological know-how".

Broadcasts and recordings 

The BBC filmed a documentary following the tour as part of the news and current affairs television programme Nationwide, titled Kate Bush: On Tour. The special was screened on BBC1 on 31 August 1979. Although it did not show any of the full performances, it featured Bush discussing her involvement in the tour, and incorporated footage of dance and band rehearsals, before showing footage of the final rehearsals at the Rainbow Theatre and the official opening night in Liverpool. It also included a screening of the music video for the single "Hammer Horror". A documentary following two performances of the tour for German audiences entitled Kate Bush in Concert was also aired in Germany in May 1980.

Two physical releases were spawned by the tour. EMI Records released the extended play (EP) On Stage on 31 August 1979, featuring live performances of the songs "Them Heavy People", "Don't Push Your Foot on the Heartbrake", "James and the Cold Gun" and "L'Amour Looks Something Like You" as recorded at the Hammersmith Odeon on 13 May 1979. The EP peaked at number 10 and spent nine weeks on the UK Singles Chart. An hour length video of aspects of the concert was released as a home video directed by Keith McMillan titled Live at Hammersmith Odeon in 1981. Also recorded on 13 May 1979, the video featured only twelve performances as others were marred by technical difficulties. In 1994, the video was re-issued as a box set including an audio CD of the broadcast as well as the video. Neither the EP nor the home video make reference to the name "Tour of Life", which was not coined until after the tour's completion.

Set list
"Moving"
"The Saxophone Song"
"Room for the Life"
"Them Heavy People"
"The Man with the Child in His Eyes"
"Egypt"
"L'Amour Looks Something Like You"
"Violin"
"The Kick Inside"
Interlude John Carder Bush poetry reading
"In the Warm Room"
"Fullhouse" (not performed at the Hammersmith Odeon dates in London)
"Strange Phenomena"
"Hammer Horror" (not performed live)
"Kashka From Baghdad"
Interlude Chanting
"Don't Push Your Foot on the Heartbrake"
"Wow"
"Coffee Homeground" (with extended instrumental introduction)
"In Search of Peter Pan"
Interlude John Carder Bush poetry reading
"Symphony in Blue" (contains elements of "Gymnopédie 1" by Erik Satie)
"Feel It" (with instrumental introduction)
"Kite"
"James and the Cold Gun"
Encore 1
"Oh England My Lionheart"
Encore 2
"Wuthering Heights"

Personnel
Credits and personnel adapted from the Kate Bush Tour programme available at the concerts.

Performers
Ben Barson – synthesizer, acoustic guitar
Brian Bath – electric guitar, acoustic mandolin, background vocals
Kate Bush – vocals, piano, keyboards
Paddy Bush – mandolin, background vocals, various instruments
Simon Drake – magician
Glenys Groves – background vocals
Preston Heyman – Drums/Percussion
Kevin McAlea – piano, keyboards, saxophone, 12-string guitar
Alan Murphy – electric guitar, whistles
Del Palmer – bass guitar
Liz Pearson – background vocals

Production
Conception, producer, director – Kate Bush
Production design, stage direction – Dave Jackson
Stage management – Nick Levitt
Stage crew – Cliff Carter, Martin Prior, Gerry Raymond Barker, Andrew Bryant
Costuming – Lisa Hayes
Costuming assistance – Hermione Brakspear
Choreography – Anthony Van Laast

Audiovisuals
Sound engineering – Gordon Patterson
Projections – Ken Sutherland
Lighting consulting – James Dann
Spoken word and poetry – John Carder Bush
Photography – Gered Mankowitz, Terry Walker, Hirchono

Tour management
Promotion – Lindsay Brown
Tour management – Richard Ames
Programmes – Kate Bush, Nicholas Wade, Nick Price
Tour graphics and merchandise – Paul Maxwell Ltd.
Tour co-ordination – Hilary Walker, John Carder Bush

Tour dates

Notes

References

Further reading

1979 concert tours
Kate Bush concert tours
Concert tours of Europe
Concert tours of the United Kingdom
Concert tours of Sweden
Concert tours of Denmark
Concert tours of Germany
Concert tours of the Netherlands
Concert tours of France